Yánhú  (盐湖) may refer to the following locations in the People's Republic of China:

Yanhu District, Yuncheng, Shanxi
Yanhu, Changning, Hunan, town
Yanhu Township, Gê'gyai County, Tibet AR